The Takoma Park Neighborhood Library is part of the District of Columbia Public Library (DCPL) System. It was opened to the public in 1911.

History

Prior to the current public library opening in 1911, the community was served by a small lending library, known as the Takoma Club and Library. That library opened May 1, 1900 on Oak Avenue, across from the Baltimore & Ohio Railroad station. The current Takoma Park Branch was built at 416 Cedar Street, NW using a $40,000 gift from Andrew Carnegie. The building is one of four Carnegie-funded library buildings in Washington, D.C. The current library stands in the Takoma Park National Register Historic District designated in 1983. The building received an extensive makeover in 2009.

See also
 District of Columbia Public Library
 List of Carnegie libraries in Washington, D.C.
 Takoma Park, Washington, D.C.

References

External links
DC Public Library" Takoma Park Neighborhood Library page
K-12 School Reading List

Library buildings completed in 1911
Public libraries in Washington, D.C.
Carnegie libraries in Washington, D.C.
Takoma (Washington, D.C.)